Albert Henry Broadbent (20 August 1934 – 23 October 2006) was an English footballer who played on the left wing. He scored 99 goals from 485 appearances in the Football League.

Career
Born in Dudley, Worcestershire, Broadbent commenced his career with Dudley Town before joining Notts County in March 1952. After 11 goals in 31 games, and playing a part in the club's run to the FA Cup quarter-finals, he linked up with Sheffield Wednesday in July 1955, a fee of £6,000 securing his services. His first season for the club saw him record 12 goals as Wednesday secured the Football League Second Division title. On Christmas Eve 1957 he moved on to join Rotherham United and then on to Doncaster Rovers. In November 1961 he joined Lincoln City before returning to Doncaster Rovers in exchange for Bobby Rooney. Spells at Bradford Park Avenue and Hartlepools United ended his League career after 485 games and 99 goals.

Broadbent died in Sheffield, where he had lived since joining Sheffield Wednesday. His death was marked by a minute's silence before Doncaster Rovers' 0–0 home draw with Leyton Orient on 4 November 2006.

References

External links
Sheffield Wednesday playing record
Hartlepool United playing record

English footballers
Association football wingers
English Football League players
Dudley Town F.C. players
Notts County F.C. players
Sheffield Wednesday F.C. players
Rotherham United F.C. players
Doncaster Rovers F.C. players
Lincoln City F.C. players
Bradford (Park Avenue) A.F.C. players
Hartlepool United F.C. players
Scarborough F.C. players
1934 births
2006 deaths
Sportspeople from Dudley